Cercozoa is a phylum of diverse single-celled eukaryotes. They lack shared morphological characteristics at the microscopic level, and are instead defined by molecular phylogenies of rRNA and actin or polyubiquitin. They were the first major eukaryotic group to be recognized mainly through molecular phylogenies. They are the natural predators of many species of bacteria. They are closely related to the phylum Retaria, comprising amoeboids that usually have complex shells, and together form a supergroup called Rhizaria.

Characteristics
The group includes most amoeboids and flagellates that feed by means of filose pseudopods. These may be restricted to part of the cell surface, but there is never a true cytostome or mouth as found in many other protozoa. They show a variety of forms and have proven difficult to define in terms of structural characteristics, although their unity is strongly supported by phylogenetic studies.

Diversity
Some cercozoans are grouped by whether they are "filose" or "reticulose" in the behavior of their cytoskeleton when moving:
Filose, meaning their pseudopods develop as filopodia. For example:
Euglyphids, filose amoebae with shells of siliceous scales or plates, which are commonly found in soils, nutrient-rich waters, and on aquatic plants.
Gromia, a shelled amoeba.
Tectofilosids, filose amoebae that produce organic shells.
Cercomonads, common soil-dwelling amoeboflagellates.
Reticulose, meaning they form a reticulating net of pseudopods. For example:
Chlorarachniophytes, set apart by the presence of chloroplasts bound by four membranes and still possess a vestigial nucleus, called a nucleomorph.  As such, they have been of great interest to researchers studying the endosymbiotic origins of organelles.
Other important ecological groups are:
Granofilosea, comprising several groups traditionally considered heliozoa such as Heliomonadida, Desmothoracida and Gymnosphaerida.
Phaeodaria, marine protozoa previously considered radiolarians.
Phytomyxea, parasites of mostly plants, including the fungi-like plasmodiophores.
Ascetosporea, parasites of mostly marine invertebrates.

Ecology
As well as being highly diverse in morphology and physiology, Cercozoa also shows high ecological diversity. The phylum Cercozoa includes many of the most abundant and ecologically significant protozoa in soil, marine and freshwater ecosystems.

Soil-dwelling cercozoans are one of the dominant groups of free-living eukaryotic microorganisms found in temperate soils, accounting for around 30% of identifiable protozoan DNA in arid or semi-arid soils and 15% in more humid soils. In transcriptomic analyses they account for 40-60% of all identifiable protozoan RNA found in forest and grassland soils. They also comprise 9-24% of all operational taxonomic units found in the ocean floor.

Some cercozoa are coprophilic or coprozoic, meaning they use feces as a source of nutrients or as transport through animal hosts. The faecal habitat is an understudied reservoir of microbial eukaryotic diversity, dominated by amoeboflagellates from the phylum Cercozoa. Strongly coprophilic examples of cercozoa are the flagellates Cercomonas, Proleptomonas and Helkesimastix, and the sorocarpic amoeba Guttulinopsis. Many new cercozoan lineages, especially among sarcomonads, have been discovered through phylogenetic sampling of feces because they appear preferentially in this medium.

Cercozoan bacterivores (i.e. predators of bacteria) are highly diverse and important in the plant phyllosphere, the leaf surfaces of plants. Particularly sarcomonads, with their ability to cyst, feed and multiply within hours, are perfectly adapted to the fluctuating environmental factors in the phyllosphere. Their predation causes shifts in the bacterial communities: they reduce populations of alphaproteobacteria and betaproteobacteria, which are less resistant to their grazing, in favour of other bacterial populations such as gammaproteobacteria.

Phylogeny

The initial molecular phylogenetic analyses of Cercozoa, based on ribosomal RNA and tubulins, recognized two subphyla, Endomyxa and Filosa, and showed a close relationship with phylum Retaria.

However, the monophyly of the group was still uncertain. Posterior phylogenomic analyses consistently recovered Cercozoa as a paraphyletic group, and Endomyxa was often clustered with Retaria. As a result, the current taxonomy of Rhizaria places Endomyxa inside the phylum Retaria instead of Cercozoa, which has therefore become synonymous with Filosa.

Despite the taxonomic change of Endomyxa into phylum Retaria, thanks to better phylogenomic sampling a 2019 analysis recovered phylum Cercozoa as a monophyletic group, with Endomyxa being the sister group to Filosa. In the same analysis, Endomyxa, Filosa, Reticulofilosa and Monadofilosa are proven to be monophyletic too.

In addition to Endomyxa and Filosa, a variety of clades inside Cercozoa have been discovered in other analyses and have slowly been described and named, such as Tremulida (previously known as Novel Clade 11) and Aquavolonida (Novel Clade 10), although their specific positions among the two main cercozoan subphyla have yet to be refined.

Classification
The classification of Cercozoa as revised in 2018, with the addition of Endomyxa:

Gallery

References

External links
 Tree of Life Cercozoa
 phylogeny of Phaeodarea

 
SAR supergroup phyla
Taxa named by Thomas Cavalier-Smith